Balika Badhu may refer to:

 Balika Badhu (1967 film), a 1967 Bengali film directed by Tarun Majumdar
 Balika Badhu (1976 film), a 1976 Hindi film directed by Tarun Majumdar
 Balika Vadhu, an Indian television series